George Spencer-Churchill, 6th Duke of Marlborough (27 December 1793 – 1 July 1857), styled Earl of Sunderland until 1817 and Marquess of Blandford between 1817 and 1840, was a British nobleman, politician, and peer. The great-grandfather of Sir Winston Churchill, he served as Lord-Lieutenant of Oxfordshire between 1842 and 1857.

Background and education
Styled Earl of Sunderland from birth, he was born at Bill Hill, Hurst, Berkshire (an estate his father was renting at the time), the eldest son of George Spencer, Marquess of Blandford (later George Spencer-Churchill, 5th Duke of Marlborough) and his wife, the former Lady Susan Stewart, daughter of John Stewart, 7th Earl of Galloway. He was educated at Eton between 1805 and 1811, and later at Christ Church, Oxford. He was also given an honorary Doctorate of Civil Laws by Oxford University on 15 June 1841.

Political career
He became known by the courtesy title Marquess of Blandford in 1817, when his father succeeded to the dukedom. He sat as a Tory Member of Parliament for Chippenham between 1818 and 1820, and for Woodstock from 1826 to 1831, from 1832 to 1835 and from 1838 to 1840, when he succeeded to the dukedom and entered the House of Lords. In 1842, he was appointed Lord Lieutenant of Oxfordshire, a post he held until his death. On 20 March 1845 he was appointed Lieutenant-Colonel Commandant of the Queen's Own Oxfordshire Yeomanry in which his two eldest sons also served.

In parliament, Blandford became an Ultra-Tory, splitting with Wellington in opposition to Catholic emancipation. In response to the Roman Catholic Relief Act 1829, Blandford introduced the first major reform bill in February 1830, calling for transfer of rotten borough seats to the counties and large towns, disfranchisement of non-resident voters, prevention of holders of office under the Crown from sitting in Parliament, payment of a salary to MPs, and the general franchise for men who owned property. He believed that somewhat more open elections could be relied upon to oppose Catholicism.

Cricket
He played cricket as a young man and is recorded in one first-class match in 1817, totalling 4 runs with a highest score of 4.

Family

As a young man, he and Harriet Caroline Octavia Spencer (1798–1831), daughter of William Robert Spencer (youngest son of Lord Charles Spencer), went through a false ceremony of marriage with a relative of the groom posing as a cleric. A voyage to Scotland, where they lived as husband and wife, was intended by the bride and her parents to make this marriage legal under Scottish law. The sixth Duke did, however, successfully contest in a court of law that they had lived as if they had been married.

Child by Harriet Caroline Octavia Spencer, who subsequently married her cousin, Count Karl Theodor von Westerholt (1795–1863), son of Count Alexander von Westerholt, in 1819:
 Susan Harriett Elizabeth Churchill (1818–1887), married Aimé Timothée Cuénod (1808–1882).

He married, firstly, his first cousin Lady Jane Stewart (1798–1844), daughter of George Stewart, 8th Earl of Galloway, on 13 January 1819. They had four children:
Lady Louisa Spencer-Churchill (c. 1820–1882), married the Hon. Robert Spencer, son of Francis Spencer, 1st Baron Churchill, and had issue.
John Winston Spencer-Churchill, 7th Duke of Marlborough (1822–1883).
Lord Alfred Spencer-Churchill (1824–1893), married the Hon. Harriet Gough-Calthorpe, daughter of Frederick Gough, 4th Baron Calthorpe, and had issue.
Lord Alan Spencer-Churchill (25 July 1825 – 18 April 1873), married Rosalind Dowker.

After his first wife's death in October 1844, aged 46, he married, secondly, the Hon. Charlotte Augusta Flower (1818–1850), daughter of Henry Flower, 4th Viscount Ashbrook, on 10 June 1846. They had two children:
Lord Almeric Athelstan Spencer-Churchill (1847 – 12 December 1856), died young.
Lady Clementina Augusta Spencer-Churchill (4 May 1848 – 27 March 1886), married John Pratt, 3rd Marquess Camden, and had issue.

After his second wife's death in April 1850, aged 31, he married, thirdly, his first cousin Jane Frances Clinton Stewart (1818–1897), daughter of the Hon. Edward Richard Stewart and granddaughter of John Stewart, 7th Earl of Galloway, on 18 October 1851. They had one child:
Lord Edward Spencer-Churchill (28 March 1853 – 5 May 1911), married Augusta Warburton, daughter of Major George Drought Warburton, and had issue.

The 6th Duke of Marlborough died at Blenheim Palace on 1 July 1857, aged 63, and was succeeded by his eldest son, John. The Duchess of Marlborough died at 28 Grosvenor Street in Mayfair, London, in March 1897, aged 79.

Sources
 Mary Soames; The Profligate Duke: George Spencer Churchill, Fifth Duke of Marlborough, and His Duchess (1987)

References

External links

1793 births
1857 deaths
Alumni of Christ Church, Oxford
George Spencer-Churchill, 6th Duke of Marlborough
106
Blandford, George Spencer-Churchill, Marquess of
Lord-Lieutenants of Oxfordshire
People educated at Eton College
People from Hurst, Berkshire
Blandford, George Spencer-Churchill, Marquess of
Blandford, George Spencer-Churchill, Marquess of
Blandford, George Spencer-Churchill, Marquess of
Blandford, George Spencer-Churchill, Marquess of
Blandford, George Spencer-Churchill, Marquess of
UK MPs who inherited peerages
Queen's Own Oxfordshire Hussars officers
English cricketers
English cricketers of 1787 to 1825
Ultra-Tory MPs